Brigadier David Adie Whitehead,  (30 September 1896 – 23 October 1992) was an Australian Army officer who fought in both First and Second World Wars.

Early life and First World War
Born on 30 September 1896 in Leith, Scotland, David Whitehead enlisted in the Australian Army as a cadet lieutenant in the Permanent Force on 1 September 1913. He received officer training at Royal Military College, Duntroon in Canberra and was commissioned as an officer on 4 April 1916. During his time at Duntroon, Whitehead earned the nickname of "Torpy", in reference to the Whitehead torpedo, and the sobriquet stuck with him for the remainder of his life. Upon graduation Whitehead was seconded to the Australian Imperial Force (AIF) in France where he commanded the 23rd Machine Gun Company from April 1917 until he was made adjutant of the 3rd Machine Gun Battalion in July 1918. He was awarded the Military Cross in September 1918 for leading a battery of eight machine guns under heavy fire during an attack in late August.

Interbellum and Second World War
Whitehead left the full-time army after returning to Australia in 1919, but continued to serve in the part-time Citizens Military Forces (CMF). He held a number of regimental positions, and was promoted to lieutenant colonel and command of the 1st Machine Gun Regiment in October 1937.

Following the outbreak of the Second World War, David Whitehead enlisted in the Second Australian Imperial Force in March 1940 and was appointed the commander of the 2/2nd Machine Gun Battalion in May that year. He was given command of the 2/32nd Battalion in February 1942 and was promoted to brigadier in September and assumed command of the 26th Brigade. Whitehead led the brigade through the Second Battle of El Alamein during October and November in which it took part in heavy fighting.

After El Alamein Whitehead and his brigade returned to Australia in early 1943 to participate in operations against the Japanese. The 26th Brigade took part in the Landing at Lae in September 1943 and the Huon Peninsula campaign from October 1943 to January 1944. Following these campaigns the brigade returned to Australia, and did not see action again until 1945. In May 1945 Whitehead commanded the Australian landing at Tarakan. During this operation the 26th Brigade was expanded to almost the size of a division, and United States Army and Netherlands East Indies units served under Whitehead's command. Whitehead relinquished command of the 26th Brigade on 10 December 1945 and returned to Australia two days later.

Later life
Following the war, Whitehead returned to citizen soldiering and was commander of the CMF 2nd Armoured Brigade from November 1947. He also served as the aide de camp to the Governor General of Australia between January 1949 and May 1952 and commanded the CMF contingent which attended the coronation of Queen Elizabeth II between March and June 1953. Whitehead retired from the army in 1954. After leaving the military Whitehead worked as a manager at Shell between 1945 and 1956. From 1956 until his retirement in 1961 he was an arbitrator with the Conciliation and Arbitration Commission. David Whitehead died in 1992.

References
Footnotes

Bibliography

External links
 
 Whitehead papers, February 1916 – March 1919/ David Adie Whitehead held at State Library of New South Wales, accessed 24 November 2013.

1896 births
1992 deaths
Australian brigadiers
Australian Commanders of the Order of the British Empire
Australian Companions of the Distinguished Service Order
Australian military personnel of World War I
Australian Army personnel of World War II
Australian recipients of the Military Cross
People from Leith
Recipients of the Croix de Guerre (France)
Royal Military College, Duntroon graduates
Scottish emigrants to Australia
Military personnel from Edinburgh
Shell plc people
Australian civil engineers